The French Southern and Antarctic Lands (TAAF) is an overseas Territory ( or ) of France. It consists of:

 Adélie Land, the French claim on the continent of Antarctica.
 Crozet Islands, a group in the southern Indian Ocean, south of Madagascar.
 Kerguelen Islands, a group of volcanic islands in the southern Indian Ocean, southeast of Africa.
 Saint Paul and Amsterdam Islands, a group to the north of the Kerguelen Islands.
 The Scattered Islands, a dispersed group of islands around the coast of Madagascar.

The territory is sometimes referred to as the French Southern Lands or the French Southern Territories, usually to emphasize non-recognition of French sovereignty over Adélie Land as part of the Antarctic Treaty System.

The entire territory has no permanently settled inhabitants. Approximately 150 (in the winter) to 310 (in the summer) people are usually present in the French Southern and Antarctic Lands at any time, but they are mainly made up of military personnel, officials, scientific researchers and support staff.

On July 5, 2019, the Crozet, Kerguelen, and Saint Paul and Amsterdam Islands were inscribed as a UNESCO World Heritage Site as the "French Austral Lands and Seas" because of their pristine wilderness, biodiversity, and enormous bird colonies.

History 

Several of the islands within this territory were originally discovered as part of the sea route to India. The Portuguese discovered Île Saint-Paul in the sixteenth century; in the seventeenth century, the Dutch became the first to land on (and name) Île Amsterdam. The French discovered the Crozet Islands some time later, in the eighteenth century; the other islands were also first explored by Europeans in this time frame.

Administration 
Formerly, they were administered from Paris by an  assisted by a secretary-general; since December 2004, however, their administrator has been a préfet, currently Charles Giusti, with headquarters in Saint Pierre on Réunion Island.

The TAAF administration, the French Polar Institute Paul-Émile Victor (IPEV) and the French Navy jointly operate the icebreaker Astrolabe which is based out of Reunion. The vessel is used both to bring personnel and supplies to the Dumont d'Urville Station and for research and patrol duties. 

The territory is divided into five districts:
 a According to new law 2007-224 of February 21, 2007, the Scattered Islands constitute the TAAF's fifth district. The TAAF website does not mention their population. The data are not included in the totals.b The Îles Éparses principal station is on Tromelin Island. The headquarters of the district chief lies beyond the TAAF, in Saint Pierre on Réunion Island.c The Territory's principal station is Martin-de-Viviès on Amsterdam Island. The capital and headquarters of the territorial administrator lies beyond the TAAF, in Saint Pierre on Réunion Island.

Each district is headed by a district chief, who has powers similar to those of a French mayor (including recording births and deaths and being an officer of judicial police).

Because there is no permanent population, there is no elected assembly, nor does the territory send representatives to the national parliament.

Geography 

The territory includes Amsterdam Island, Saint Paul Island, the Crozet Islands, and the Kerguelen Islands in the southern Indian Ocean near 43°S, 67°E, along with Adélie Land, the sector of Antarctica claimed by France, named by the French explorer Jules Dumont d'Urville after his wife.

Adélie Land (about ) and the islands, totaling , have no indigenous inhabitants, though in 1997 there were about 100 researchers whose numbers varied from winter (July) to summer (January).

Amsterdam Island and Saint Paul Island are extinct volcanoes and have been delineated as the Amsterdam and Saint-Paul Islands temperate grasslands ecoregion.

The islands in the Indian Ocean are supplied by the special ship Marion Dufresne sailing out of Le Port in Réunion Island. Terre Adélie is supplied by L'Astrolabe sailing out of Hobart in Tasmania.

However, the territory has a merchant marine fleet totaling (in 1999) 2,892,911 GRT/, including seven bulk carriers, five cargo ships, ten chemical tankers, nine container ships, six liquefied gas carriers, 24 petroleum tankers, one refrigerated cargo ship, and ten roll-on-roll-off (RORO) carriers. This fleet is maintained as a subset of the French register that allows French-owned ships to operate under more liberal taxation and manning regulations than permissible under the main French register. This register, however, is to vanish, replaced by the International French Register (Registre International Français, RIF).

Flora and fauna 

Due to their isolation, the French islands in the southern Indian Ocean comprise one of the last remaining large wilderness areas on Earth. Furthermore, the islands are positioned along the Antarctic Convergence, where upwelling creates nutrient-rich waters. As a result, birds and marine mammals gather on the islands in great abundance. More than 50 million birds of 47 species breed on the islands, including more than half the breeding population of 16 different species. The largest populations of king penguins and the endangered Indian yellow-nosed albatross on Earth are found on the Crozet Islands and Amsterdam Island, respectively. Other threatened bird species with important populations on the islands include Eaton's pintail, MacGillivray's prion, and the Amsterdam albatross, which is one of four bird species endemic to the island group. The French Southern Lands also hold the second largest population of southern elephant seals on Earth, numbering roughly 200,000, and the third largest population of the Antarctic fur seal. 

Because of their isolation and subpolar location, the French Southern Lands are relatively depauperate of vegetation, which both Saint-Paul and Crozet having no native tree or shrub species. However, eight of the 36 higher plant species are endemic. Some species of endemic invertebrates have also been recorded on the islands, including moths and flies which have lost their wings in the absence of predators.

Economy 

The territory's natural resources are limited to fish and crustaceans. Economic activity is limited to servicing meteorological and geophysical research stations and French and other fishing fleets.

The main fish resources are Patagonian toothfish and spiny lobster. Both are poached by foreign fleets; because of this, the French Navy, and occasionally other services, patrol the zone and arrest poaching vessels. Such arrests can result in heavy fines and/or the seizure of the ship.

France previously sold licenses to foreign fisheries to fish the Patagonian toothfish; because of overfishing, it is now restricted to a small number of fisheries from Réunion Island.

The territory takes in revenues of about €16 million a year.

Codes 
The French Southern Territories (i.e. the TAAF excluding Adélie Land) have been given the following country codes: FS (FIPS) and TF (ISO 3166-1 alpha-2).

See also 

 Administrative divisions of France
 
 French colonial empire
 French Fifth Republic
 
 List of French islands in the Indian and Pacific oceans
 List of French possessions and colonies
 Outline of France
 Overseas France

References

External links 

 
 
 French Southern and Antarctic Lands – official French website 
 French Southern and Antarctic Lands. The World Factbook. Central Intelligence Agency.
 
 Southern & Antarctic Territories
 Crozet Archipelago
 Kerguelen Archipelago
 Terre Adélie

 
1955 establishments in France
1955 in Antarctica
Dependent territories in Africa
East African countries
France and the Antarctic
Geography of Antarctica
Geography of Overseas France
Island countries of the Indian Ocean
Overseas France
Ramsar sites in France
Southeast African countries
Special territories of the European Union
States and territories established in 1955
Territorial claims in Antarctica
World Heritage Sites in France